Defending champions Gigi Fernández and Natasha Zvereva defeated Jana Novotná and Arantxa Sánchez Vicario in the final, 1–6, 6–1, 6–4 to win the women's doubles tennis title at the 1996 US Open. It was Fernández' fifth US Open, 15th major and 66th overall title for Fernández, and Zvereva's fourth US Open, 15th major and 60th overall title.

Seeds

Qualifying

Draw

Finals

Top half

Section 1

Section 2

Bottom half

Section 3

Section 4

External links
 Official results archive (WTA)
1996 US Open – Women's draws and results at the International Tennis Federation

Women's Doubles
US Open (tennis) by year – Women's doubles
1996 in women's tennis
1996 in American women's sports